Glycerine acetate is a mixture of esters produced from the esterification of glycerol (1) with acetic acid. Multiple products can be produced from this reaction; these include the monoacetylglycerols (MAG, 2 and 3), diacetylglycerols (DAG, 4 and 5), and triacetalglycerol (TAG, triacetin, 6).

DAG and TAG can be used as fuel additives for improving the cold and viscosity properties of biodiesel or the antiknocking properties of gasoline.

Notes 

Acetate esters
Glycerol esters